Bessacarr is a ward in the metropolitan borough of Doncaster, South Yorkshire, England.  The ward contains two listed buildings that are recorded in the National Heritage List for England.  Of these, one is listed at Grade II*, the middle of the three grades, and the other is at Grade II, the lowest grade.   The ward is to the southeast of the centre of Doncaster and is residential.  The listed buildings are a church with medieval origins, and a 20th-century house.


Key

Buildings

References

Citations

Sources

 

Lists of listed buildings in South Yorkshire